Pinegrove on Audiotree Live is the first live album by American rock band Pinegrove, released May 27, 2016 on Audiotree Music. The group, which formed in 2010, developed a following with their mix of Americana and emo. The performance was filmed and released through Audiotree, a Chicago, Illinois–based music company.

Background
Audiotree, an American record label and music discovery platform, was founded in Chicago, Illinois in 2011. The company became known for its high-quality videos of live performances, mainly from independent musicians. Its associated YouTube channel became a popular destination for indie music fans in the 2010s. Forbes writer Melissa Daniels reports that, like all Audiotree performances, it was not further mixed in post-production; "what you hear is real," she wrote.

Pinegrove on Audiotree Live was filmed and recorded at the company's Chicago studio space on April 30, 2016. The group were interviewed by a host, though these segments were omitted from the streaming release. At the time, the quintet were in the midst of a national tour supporting the emo act Into It. Over It. Daniels noted the band were considered "breakout indie stars" at the time of their appearance.

Pinegrove frontman Evan Stephens Hall later discussed the performance:

Reception
Sam Sodomsky of Pitchfork described it as "legendary," and "tailor-made for introducing new fans to the band." Hall has noted that the performance introduced many fans to the band for the first time.

Track listing

Personnel
Evan Stephens Hall – vocals, guitar
Josh Marre – guitar, backing vocals
David Mitchell – bass
Zack Levine – drums, backing vocals

References

External links

Pinegrove on Audiotree Live at Bandcamp (streamed copy where licensed)

2016 live albums
Pinegrove (band) albums